Atranus is a genus of beetles in the family Carabidae, containing the following species:

 Atranus pubescens (Dejean, 1828)
 Atranus ruficollis Gautier des Cottes, 1858

References

Platyninae